DOS 2 or DOS-2 may refer to:

 A failed Soviet space station DOS-2, part of the Salyut programme
 Atari DOS 2.0 for the Atari 8-bit family

It may also refer to versions of the Microsoft MS-DOS family:
 MS-DOS 2.00, Microsoft (internal) version in 1982 and 1983, successor of MS-DOS 1.xx, licensed to various OEMs including IBM
 MS-DOS 2.01, Microsoft (internal) version in 1983
 MS-DOS 2.10, Microsoft (internal) version in 1983
 MS-DOS 2.11, Microsoft (internal) version in 1983
 MS-DOS 2.11R, a ROMed version for Tandy PCs in 1988 
 MS-DOS 2.12, a special OEM version for the TI Professional in 1983/1984
 MS-DOS 2.25, Microsoft version with extended multilanguage support in 1985

It may also refer to versions of the IBM PC DOS family:
 PC DOS 2.0, successor of PC DOS 1.1 in 1983
 PC DOS 2.1, successor of PC DOS 2.0 in 1983
 PC DOS 2.11, successor of PC DOS 2.1 in 1984

It may also refer to operating systems of the Digital Research family:
 DOS Plus 1.0, a single-user variant of Concurrent PC DOS in 1985
 DOS Plus 1.1, a single-user variant of Concurrent PC DOS in 1985
 DOS Plus 1.2, a single-user variant of Concurrent PC DOS 4.1 in 1986
 DOS Plus 2.1, a single-user variant of Concurrent PC DOS 5.0 in 1988

See also
 DOS (disambiguation)
 DOS 1 (disambiguation)
 DOS 3 (disambiguation)
 DOS 20 (disambiguation)
 DOS 286 (disambiguation)